This is a list of the India national football team's results from 1933 to the present day that, for various reasons, are not accorded the status of official International A Matches.

1920s

1930s

1940s

1950s

1960s

1970s

1980s

1990s

2000s

2010s

2020s

References

External links

Lists of national association football team unofficial results
Unofficial